Joel C. Kitchens (born September 20, 1957) is an American veterinary doctor and Republican politician.  He is a member of the Wisconsin State Assembly representing the 1st Assembly district.

Biography

Born in Washington, D.C., to Thomas W. Kitchens, Jr. and Fleurette Kitchens, Kitchens moved around frequently as his father served in various positions with the Federal Bureau of Investigation.  Kitchens received his bachelor's degree and doctor of veterinary medicine degrees from Ohio State University. He moved to Sturgeon Bay, Wisconsin and began a veterinarian practice there in 1984. He was elected to the Sturgeon Bay School District Board of Education in 1999, eventually becoming its President . On November 4, 2014, Kitchens was elected to the Wisconsin State Assembly as a Republican.

References

External links
 
 
 Representative Joel Kitchens at Wisconsin Legislature

1957 births
Living people
People from Sturgeon Bay, Wisconsin
People from Washington, D.C.
Ohio State University alumni
School board members in Wisconsin
21st-century American politicians
Republican Party members of the Wisconsin State Assembly